Mniotype aulombardi is a moth in the family Noctuidae. It is found in Taiwan.

References

Moths described in 1994
Cuculliinae
Moths of Taiwan